Beauty Is a Rare Thing is a compilation box set collecting all the master recordings made for Atlantic Records between 1959 and 1961 by the American jazz composer and saxophonist Ornette Coleman. The set was released on Rhino Records in 1993, and reissued in March 2015.

Background
Prior to signing with Atlantic in 1959, Coleman and his group had recorded Something Else!!!! and Tomorrow Is the Question! for the Los Angeles-based label Contemporary Records. Coleman had not been completely pleased with either, and he found audiences dwindling at the Hillcrest Club (not the Hillcrest Country Club) in Los Angeles where he played regularly. However, one evening, pianist John Lewis of the Modern Jazz Quartet saw the Coleman group and immediately became an evangelist for Ornette's new approach, securing Coleman both a summer residency at the Tanglewood Music Center and a recording contract with the MJQ's label, Atlantic, through the label's executive in charge of jazz, Nesuhi Ertegun.

Recording sessions took place at Radio Recorders in Los Angeles on May 22, and October 8 and 9, 1959, at Atlantic Studios in New York City on July 19 and 26, and August 2, 1960, and January 31, and March 22 and 27, 1961, and at A&R Studios in New York on December 19, 20 and 21, 1960. The producer of the original recording sessions was Nesuhi Ertegun.

Content
The box presents the material in chronological recording order. The set includes the total tracks from all six of his Atlantic albums, The Shape of Jazz to Come (October 1959), Change of the Century (June 1960), This Is Our Music (February 1961), Free Jazz (September 1961), Ornette! (February 1962), and Ornette on Tenor (December 1962), as well as the later compilations The Art of the Improvisers (November 1970), Twins (October 1971), and the Japan-only To Whom Who Keeps A Record (1975). Two additional tracks were released on the Gunther Schuller album John Lewis Presents Contemporary Music: Jazz Abstractions – Compositions by Gunther Schuller and Jim Hall of 1961, and six previously unreleased performances appear here for the first time. The insert booklet contains text by Robert Palmer, forewords by Coleman and trumpeter Don Cherry, as well as various quotes of reaction to Coleman's music by Paul Bley, Miles Davis, Roy Eldridge, Gil Evans, Maynard Ferguson, Dizzy Gillespie, Charlie Haden, Herbie Hancock, Joe Henderson, John Lewis, Shelly Manne, Jackie McLean, Charles Mingus, and Thelonious Monk.

Reception

The AllMusic review by Thom Jurek states that "this is, along with John Coltrane's Atlantic set and the Miles and Coltrane box, one of the most essential jazz CD purchases". The Penguin Guide to Jazz in all editions prior to its ninth awarded the set one of its rare crown accolades.

Track listing
All compositions by Ornette Coleman except "Embraceable You" by George Gershwin and Ira Gershwin, and "Abstraction" and "Variants on a Theme of Thelonious Monk" by Gunther Schuller.

Disc one

Disc two

Disc three

Disc four

Disc five

Disc six

Personnel
 Ornette Coleman — alto saxophone, tenor saxophone
 Don Cherry — pocket trumpet, cornet discs one to five, and disc six tracks 1–6
 Charlie Haden — bass discs one to four
 Scott LaFaro — bass disc four tracks 4 & 5, disc five, and disc six tracks 7 & 8
 Jimmy Garrison — bass disc six tracks 1–6
 Billy Higgins — drums disc one, disc two tracks 1–5, and disc four tracks 4 & 5
 Ed Blackwell — drums disc two tracks 6–12, discs three to five, and disc six tracks 1–6

Additional personnel
 Freddie Hubbard — trumpet disc four tracks 4 & 5
 Eric Dolphy — bass clarinet disc four tracks 4 & 5; alto saxophone, bass clarinet, flute disc six track 8
 Charles Libove, Roland Vamos — violins disc six tracks 7 & 8
 Harry Zaratzian — viola disc six tracks 7 & 8
 Joseph Tekula — cello disc six tracks 7 & 8
 Robert DiDomenica — flute disc six track 8
 Eddie Costa — vibraphone disc six track 8
 Bill Evans — piano disc six track 8
 Jim Hall — guitar disc six tracks 7 & 8
 Alvin Brehm — bass disc six track 7
 George Duvivier — bass disc six track 8
 Sticks Evans — drums disc six tracks 7 & 8
 Gunther Schuller — arranger, conductor disc six tracks 7 & 8

References
 

1993 albums
Ornette Coleman albums
Atlantic Records albums
Albums produced by Nesuhi Ertegun